Hero Elementary is a children's animated television series created and produced by Portfolio Entertainment and Twin Cities PBS. The series premiered on June 1, 2020, on PBS Kids. The series was created by co-creators Carol-Lynn Parente and Christine Ferraro, who previously worked on Sesame Street. The series involves the students of "The Sparks' Crew"—Lucita Sky, AJ Gadgets, Sara Snap and Benny Bubbles—who are trained in superheroics by their quirky and enthusiastic teacher, Mr. Sparks. Together the students work as a team, using their own unique superpowers, as well as the "Superpowers of Science" to help people, solve problems, and try to make the world a better place. The series has 40 half-hour episodes, each of them containing two segments.

Premise 
The series involves "The Sparks' Crew", a group of students from Hero Elementary: AJ Gadgets, Lucita Sky, Benny Bubbles, & Sara Snap and their excited teacher, Mr. Sparks. and the class pet Fur Blur, Also Known as "Sparks' Crew Hamster".

Characters

Main 
 Lucita Sky (voiced by Veronica Hortiguela) is a good-natured and caring Hispanic-American girl who inherited the power of flight from her grandmother. She serves as the leader of the Sparks' Crew. Because she can fly, Lucita can often be seen hovering off the ground. Ironically, she is acrophobic and appears to also suffer from vertigo; when flying high, Lucita always inadvertently looks down and she must be rescued herself.
 Arnold Jasper "AJ" Gadgets (voiced by Jadiel Dowlin) is a brilliant autistic African-American boy who has the power of thought projection, meaning he can project pictures of his own thoughts in front of others, and also enjoys inventing all kinds of gadgets. He has a backpack that contains all his super inventions and doubles as a jetpack for transportation. Similar to that of Reed Richards and Hank Pym, AJ has expertise in mathematics, applied science, mechanics, computers, robotics/cybernetics, artificial intelligence, nanotechnology, chemistry, and various levels of physics, but is also admittedly fond of trains and railroad engineering.
 Sara Snap (voiced by Stephany Seki) is a tomboyish Japanese-American girl who has both the powers of super strength and teleportation; Sara can teleport anywhere by snapping her left fingers. At times, Sara's teleportation can take her the wrong places. Sara is allergic to coconuts; instead of suffering from typical allergy symptoms, they cause a loss of her powers temporarily. She is also the only Sparks Crew member (and possibly the only student at Hero Elementary) to possess more than one known power.
 Benjamin "Benny" Bubbles (voiced by Stacey DePass) is a cheerful and good-natured Greek-American boy who has the power of bubble generation, meaning he can create bubbles for various reasons. Benny is also an avid animal lover, particularly jumping in to rescue abused or frightened animals during missions. He very often provides comic relief throughout the series, cracking jokes/puns and making flashy introductions, similar to that of Peter Parker and Ben Grimm.
 Mr. Enrique Sparks (voiced by Carlos Díaz) is the students' teacher who guides them through their superhero training, Mr. Sparks is the narrator of the episodes and also the mentor of the Sparks' Crew. Like Lucita, Mr. Sparks is fluent in Spanish. Mr. Sparks occasionally drives the Sparks' Crew Van for when the students have missions elsewhere.
 Fur Blur is a hamster who's the class pet and also runs really fast, Fur Blur's thoughts are exposed in large clouds. And it's clear through her emojis that she'll be as bright as the Sparks Crew one day. She can often be seen on the heads and shoulders of Mr. Sparks and the other students. Fur Blur often drives around in a red toy car while inside her hamster ball.

Other 
 Heidi (voiced by Denise Oliver) wears a pink shirt, green overalls, white socks, and purple shoes.
 Jada (voiced by Barbara Mamabolo) wears a pink flower, a pink dress, orange leggings, and purple shoes.
 Freeze Louise and Petie Heat (voiced by Denise Oliver (Freeze Louise) and Cory Doran (Petie Heat)) are twin siblings who make up "Team Tornado" at Hero Elementary. Louise is a cyan-blue haired student who can freeze anything. Petie is a red spikey-haired student who can melt anything using heat generation.
 The Amazing Memory Kid (voiced by Stephany Seki) is a student in "The Mighty Brights" class at Hero Elementary who wears a blue memory helmet, The Amazing Memory Kid doesn't really have a good memory. 
 "Turbo" Tina (voiced by Ana Sani) is a student in "The Mighty Brights" class at Hero Elementary who runs really fast. 
 "Rubberband" Robbie (voiced by Jonathan E. Gordon) is a student in "The Mighty Brights" class at Hero Elementary who can stretch to great lengths with his elastic body. 
 Dr. Inventorman (Martin Roach) is a hero inventor.
 Hail Caesar (Cory Doran) is a weather-related superhero.
 Athletica (Kristin Fairlie) is an athletic superheroine that the students idolize.
 Captain Bounceback (Alexa Hazael) is a superheroine who has the ability to bounce.
 Mrs. Mangia (Julie Lemieux) is the school's cafeteria supervisor.

Production

Episodes

Season 1 (2020-22)

Broadcast 
The series first premiered on PBS Kids in the United States on June 1, 2020, then it premiered on TVOKids in Canada on July 7, 2020, and premiered on Discovery Kids in Latin America and IRIB TV2 and IRIB Pooya Persian in 2021.

Notes

References

External links
 
 
Hero Elementary at TVOKids

2020s American animated television series
2020s American school television series
2020s Canadian animated television series
2020 American television series debuts
2020 Canadian television series debuts
2022 American television series endings
2022 Canadian television series endings
2020s Canadian children's television series
2020s American children's television series
American children's animated education television series
American children's animated superhero television series
American television series with live action and animation
Canadian children's animated education television series
Canadian children's animated superhero television series
Canadian television series with live action and animation
English-language television shows
PBS original programming
PBS Kids shows
Animated television series about children
Elementary school television series
Superhero schools
Autism in television
Hispanic and Latino American television